Sculpt may be:
a verb meaning 'to sculpture''
the name of a 2016 film